Miguel Ángel Guerrero Martín (born 12 July 1990) is a Spanish professional footballer who plays for Cypriot First Division club Anorthosis Famagusta F.C. as a forward.

Club career

Albacete
Born in Toledo, Castile-La Mancha, Guerrero started his senior career with Albacete Balompié's reserves, spending two full seasons in the Tercera División after having represented a host of clubs as a youth.

He made his official debut with the first team on 9 January 2010, appearing as a late substitute in a 0–0 away draw against Recreativo de Huelva in the Segunda División.

Sporting Gijón

In the summer of 2011, Guerrero joined Sporting de Gijón, again initially being assigned to the B side, this time in Segunda División B. On 19 August 2012 he made his official debut with the Asturians' main squad, playing 25 minutes in a 2–0 loss at CD Numancia.

On 6 January 2013, in a local derby against Real Oviedo, Guerrero scored all of Sporting B's goals in a 4–1 home victory. Roughly one month later, he scored his first goal for the first team, the opening goal in a 2–1 away win over CD Lugo.

After being promoted to the main squad in 2013, Guerrero was an important attacking player in the 2014–15 campaign, scoring 11 goals in 36 appearances for the runners-up. Highlights included braces against CD Lugo and Racing de Santander, both in May 2015.

Guerrero made his La Liga debut on 23 August 2015, starting in a 0–0 home draw against Real Madrid. He scored for the first time in the top flight on 19 October, equalising late on in a 3–3 home draw with Granada CF, and added another the following 12 February to open a 2–2 draw against Rayo Vallecano also at El Molinón as his team avoided relegation at that adversary's expense.

Leganés
On 27 June 2016, Guerrero signed a two-year deal with the option for a third at CD Leganés, newly promoted to the top tier. He scored five goals from 31 appearances in his first season, helping the club retain its league status.

Olympiacos
On 13 June 2018, Guerrero moved abroad for the first time in his career after agreeing to a three-year contract with Olympiacos FC, with a rumoured annual salary of €400,000. On 9 August, he scored a brace in a 4–0 home defeat of FC Luzern in the UEFA Europa League third qualifying round.

On 30 July 2019, Guerrero scored after a solo run in the 4–0 home victory over FC Viktoria Plzeň in the second qualifying round of the UEFA Champions League. He repeated the feat in the same competition on 21 August, as the hosts defeated FC Krasnodar in the play-off round.

Guerrero signed for six months with Leganés on 31 January 2020, with the deal including a €2.5 million buyout clause.

Nottingham Forest
On 4 September 2020, Guerrero joined EFL Championship side Nottingham Forest for an undisclosed fee. Manager Sabri Lamouchi was reportedly not interested in signing him but felt that he had no choice but to agree to the transfer as it came under the recommendation of Evangelos Marinakis, who owned both clubs. He made his debut as a substitute in a 2–0 home loss against Cardiff City on 19 September, and his first start came the following month in a 1–0 defeat at Middlesbrough.

Rayo Vallecano
Guerrero signed with Rayo Vallecano on 1 February 2021, for an undisclosed fee. He scored his only goal for the sixth-placed team – eventually promoted in the play-offs – on the 27th, equalising the 1–1 home draw with SD Ponferradina.

Ibiza
On 12 August, Guerrero moved to second-tier newcomers UD Ibiza on a two-year deal.

Career statistics

Honours
Olympiacos
Super League Greece: 2019–20
Greek Football Cup: 2019–20

References

External links

1990 births
Living people
Sportspeople from Toledo, Spain
Spanish footballers
Footballers from Castilla–La Mancha
Association football forwards
La Liga players
Segunda División players
Segunda División B players
Tercera División players
Atlético Albacete players
Albacete Balompié players
Sporting de Gijón B players
Sporting de Gijón players
CD Leganés players
Rayo Vallecano players
UD Ibiza players
Super League Greece players
Olympiacos F.C. players
OFI Crete F.C. players
English Football League players
Nottingham Forest F.C. players
Cypriot First Division players
Anorthosis Famagusta F.C. players
Spanish expatriate footballers
Expatriate footballers in Greece
Expatriate footballers in England
Expatriate footballers in Cyprus
Spanish expatriate sportspeople in Greece
Spanish expatriate sportspeople in England
Spanish expatriate sportspeople in Cyprus